Niigata 5th district (新潟[県第]5区 Niigata[-ken dai-]go-ku) is a single-member electoral district for the House of Representatives, the lower house of the National Diet of Japan. It is located in the central, Chūetsu region of Niigata and covers parts of Nagaoka City (those parts that do not belong to the 2nd and 4th districts), the cities of Ojiya, Uonuma, Minami-Uonuma ("South Uonuma") as well as the former Minami-Uonuma County that, as of 2012, only has one remaining municipality: Yuzawa Town. As of September 2012, 282,904 voters were registered in Niigata 5th district, giving its voters above average vote weight.

Before the electoral reform, the area had formed part of the five-member Niigata 3rd district of former Liberal Democratic Party (LDP) president-prime minister, faction leader and "shadow shōgun" Kakuei Tanaka and his daughter Makiko Tanaka who became science and technology minister in the Murayama Cabinet in 1994. The second ranking representative from the 3rd district in the last pre-reform election of 1993 had been former Takeshita faction Liberal Democrat Yukio Hoshino who joined the defecting Japan Renewal Party in the 1993 no-confidence vote against LDP president-prime minister Kiichi Miyazawa. After the reform, Hoshino contested the new single-member 5th district against Tanaka for the New Frontier Party, but lost to Tanaka. Tanaka became foreign minister in the Koizumi Cabinet, but was dismissed in 2002; in the same year, a scandal over (state-funded) salaries for Representative's secretaries who had allegedly been employed (and already paid) by Echigo Kōtsū ("Echigo Transportation", a Tanaka family company) led eventually to her resignation. Hoshino won the resulting by-election as an independent and joined the LDP afterwards. But in the 2003 general election, Tanaka took the 5th district back by a clear margin. She joined the Democratic Party (DPJ) parliamentary group in 2003 and the Democratic Party before the 2009 House of Representatives election. Tanaka was appointed a minister for the third time in the DPJ-led Noda Cabinet in 2012.

In the 2012 House of Representatives election, Tanaka lost the district to LDP candidate Tadayoshi Nagashima. This was 65 years after her father was first elected to represent Niigata in the lower house. Only her husband Naoki (maiden name: Suzuki) continued the Tanaka tradition in the Diet as member of the House of Councillors from Niigata until 2016.

In 2017, Nagashima died in office. The next representative was former Governor of Niigata Prefecture Hirohiko Izumida. In 2021, Izumida was challenged by two independent candidates, Tamio Mori, former Mayor of Nagaoka, and another former Niigata Governor Ryuichi Yoneyama. Yoneyama, who was endorsed by the CDP and other opposition parties, managed to win the seat. After the elections, Izumida, who managed to get a seat in the PR block, claimed he was asked to pay kickback money if he wanted to win.

List of representatives

Election results

References 

Districts of the House of Representatives (Japan)
Niigata Prefecture
Politics of Niigata Prefecture